Gymnastics events were competed at the 1994 South American Games in Valencia, Venezuela, in November 1994.

Medal summary

Medal table

Artistic gymnastics

Rhythmic gymnastics

References 

South American Games
1994 South American Games
1994 South American Games